David M. Nakama (born August 9, 1962) in an American baseball coach and former infielder, who is current hitting coach for the Hawaii Rainbow Warriors.

Nakama previously has been head coach at junior colleges Mission and Treasure Valley, Division II San Francisco State, and Division I San Jose State.

Early life and education
Born in Honolulu, Hawaii, Nakama graduated from Kaiser High School. He moved to Oregon to attended Willamette University and played at infielder for the Willamette Bearcats baseball team. Nakama graduated from Willamette in 1984 with a bachelor's degree in physical education and earned a master's in the same subject from the University of Northern Colorado in 1986.

Coaching career
Nakama was an assistant coach at Northern Colorado from 1985 to 1986 while working on his master's degree. He later was an assistant at Iowa (1987 to 1988), then moved to the junior college as an assistant at Yavapai (1989 to 1990) and De Anza (1991).

In 1991, Nakama earned his first head coaching position at Mission College in Santa Clara, California, where he remained for five seasons. He led Mission to the state junior college tournament in 1995 and 1996 and earned Coast Conference Coach of the Year honors in 1996. Nakama joined Stanford as an assistant coach under Mark Marquess in 1997.

From 1999 to 2001, Nakama served as head coach at San Francisco State.  Nakama returned to the Pac-12 as top assistant at Stanford, before moving to Washington. Nakama then returned to Stanford as assistant coach, a position he would hold from 2002 to 2009, then was an assistant on Lindsay Meggs's staff at Washington from 2010 to 2012. Meggs formally named Nakama the associate head coach on September 2, 2011.

In September 2012, Nakama was named head coach at San Jose State, his first Division I head coaching job. Nakama's time at San Jose State ended in June 2016, following a 66–162 record in four seasons; San Jose State declined to renew Nakama's contract.

Nakama returned to the junior college level on September 23, 2016, when Treasure Valley Community College in Ontario, Oregon hired him as head coach.

On July 24, 2017, Nakama returned to Washington to be a volunteer assistant coach for his second stint working under Lindsay Meggs. Following the 2019 season, Nakama was promoted to director of baseball operations.

Head coaching record
The following lists Nakama's record as an NCAA head baseball coach.

References

1962 births
Baseball coaches from Hawaii
American baseball players of Japanese descent
Baseball players from Honolulu
De Anza Dons baseball coaches
Hawaii people of Japanese descent
Hawaii Rainbow Warriors baseball coaches
Iowa Hawkeyes baseball coaches
Living people
Mission Saints baseball coaches
Northern Colorado Bears baseball coaches
San Francisco State Gators baseball coaches
San Jose State Spartans baseball coaches
Stanford Cardinal baseball coaches
Sportspeople from Honolulu
Treasure Valley Chukars baseball coaches
University of Northern Colorado alumni
Washington Huskies baseball coaches
Willamette Bearcats baseball players
Yavapai Roughriders baseball coaches